SonicCharge µTonic (MicroTonic) is a pattern based drum-machine plug-in featuring 100% synthetic drum sounds. MicroTonic was created by software developer Magnus Lidström and is the first product launched under the Sonic Charge brand. Lidström is mostly recognized for his work with Propellerhead Software, where he developed the synthesizer Malström in the 2.0 release of Reason.

History 
MicroTonic was first released in December 2003 as a VST plug-in for the Windows platform. Over the years, new versions has been released bringing new features and extended compatibility into the software. In 2004, the first Mac OS X version was available. In 2005, version 2.0 was released with over 20 new features and Audio Units support. With the introduction to Intel-based Macs in 2006, a new Universal Binary version was released. In December 2010, version 3.0 of the VST was released, with a "grid editor" enabling the control of all instruments in a single window, and a feature for morphing between presets.

See also 
 Reason

References 

Software drum machines
Software synthesizers